A Place So Foreign and Eight More is a collection of short stories by Canadian-British writer Cory Doctorow. Six of these stories were released electronically under a Creative Commons license. The collection features an introduction by Bruce Sterling, and includes "0wnz0red", which was nominated for the 2003 Nebula Award for Best Novelette.

Contents
 "The Kingdom of Magic Junk, by Bruce Sterling" (Introduction)
 "Craphound"
 "A Place So Foreign"
 "All Day Sucker"
 "To Market, To Market: The Rebranding of Billy Bailey"
 "Return to Pleasure Island"
 "Shadow of the Mothaship"
 "Home Again, Home Again"
 "The Super Man and the Bugout"
 "0wnz0red"

External links
 Six of the nine stories from this book are available free under an open source license on the author's web page and blog.

2003 short story collections
Short story collections by Cory Doctorow